Inan can refer to:

 The Arabic women's name ‘Inān, most famously born by the poet ‘Inān bint ‘Abd-Allā
 The Turkish men's name and surname İnan